Amaki is a surname. Notable people with the surname include:

Amalia Amaki (born 1949), African-American artist, art historian, educator, film critic, and curator
Jun Amaki (born 1995), Japanese gravure idol
Sally Amaki (born 2000), American singer and voice actress

Japanese-language surnames